The 4th Battalion, 42nd Field Artillery Regiment (United States) nicknamed the Straight Arrows—was a field artillery battalion in the United States Army. The Regimental motto is Festina Lente ("Make Haste, Slowly").

World War I
Constituted on 5 July 1918 in the National Army as Battery D, 42nd Field Artillery, an element of the 14th Division. It was organized on 10 August 1918 at Camp Custer, Michigan. Serving in one campaign of the First World War, Alsace 1918, the unit returned to Camp Custer, Michigan where it was demobilized on 7 February 1919.

Pre-WWII
The unit was reconstituted on 1 October 1933, in the Regular Army as Battery D, 42nd Field Artillery. It was absorbed on 1 October 1940, by Battery A, 42nd Field Artillery Battalion. Battery A, 42nd Field Artillery was redesignated on 1 October 1940, as Battery A, 42nd Field Artillery Battalion, and activated at Fort Benning, Georgia, as an element of the 4th Division (later redesignated as the 4th Infantry Division).

World War II
Battery A, 42nd Field Artillery Battalion participated in 5 campaigns in the Second World War: Normandy (with arrowhead indicating participation in the initial assault), Northern France, Rhineland, Ardennes-Alsace, and Central Europe. After the war, Battery A, 42nd Field Artillery Battalion was inactivated on 16 February 1946, at Camp Butner, North Carolina.

Cold War
Battery A, 42nd Field Artillery Battalion reactivated on 15 July 1947, at Fort Ord, California, before being consolidated on 28 June 1950, with Battery A, 42nd Coast Artillery Battalion (which had been first organized in 1907). The consolidated unit designated as Battery A, 42d Field Artillery Battalion). Former Battery D, 42nd Field Artillery, was reconstituted on 1 April 1957, in the Regular Army and redesignated as Headquarters and Headquarters Battery, 4th Battalion, 42nd Artillery.

It was redesignated on 23 April 1959, as Headquarters and Headquarters Battery, 4th Howitzer Battalion, 42nd Artillery, and assigned to the 4th Infantry Division with its organic elements concurrently constituted. The Battalion activated on 6 May 1959 at Fort Lewis, Washington. It was redesignated on 1 October 1963, as the 4th Battalion, 42nd Artillery.

Vietnam War
The Battalion served as part of the 4th Infantry Division through 11 campaigns in Vietnam, arriving in August 1966 as a towed 105mm howitzer battalion to render direct support to the 4th's 2nd Brigade.

The unit participated in the following campaigns: 
Counteroffensive Phase II
Counteroffensive Phase III
Tet Counteroffensive
Counteroffensive Phase IV 
Counteroffensive Phase V 
Counteroffensive Phase VI
Tet 69/Counteroffensive
Summer-Fall 1969
Winter-Spring 1970 
Sanctuary Counteroffensive 
Counteroffensive Phase VII

After the conflict in Vietnam, the unit returned and was inactivated on 15 December 1970, at Fort Carson, Colorado.
While inactive, the unit was redesignated on 1 September 1971 as the 4th Battalion, 42nd Field Artillery, and remained inactive until 1996.

Last unit assignments
Based at Fort Hood, TX from 1996 to 2009, and then at Fort Carson, Colorado, until 2014, the 4–42 FA was under the command of U.S. 1st Brigade 4th Infantry Division. Each of the three gun batteries (A, B, C – later only A and B), supported a different battalion in the brigade. Headquarters and Headquarters Battery (HHB) provided the necessary support components for the running of the battalion and was also home to Fire Support Specialists or "Fisters." The battalion was the first in the Army to transition to the new Conservative Heavy Division (CHD) design, and also the first Artillery Battalion to test, field, and train with the digital system (FBCB2) Future Battle Command Brigade and Below.

The battalion was equipped with the M109A6 Paladin Self Propelled Howitzer, which fires a 155mm family of munitions, and is the most technologically advanced cannon in the Army inventory. While originally designated as a field artillery battalion, they also deployed and conducted operations similar to that of an infantry battalion in order to support the ever-changing needs of the United States Army during wartime.

The battalion deactivated on 17 March 2014 at Fort Carson, CO.

Operation Iraqi Freedom
Alerted on 19 January 2003, 4-42 FA (and the 4th Infantry Division) was scheduled to take part in the Iraq War in the spring of 2003 by spearheading an advance from Turkey into northern Iraq. The Turkish Parliament refused to grant permission for the operation and the battalion's equipment remained offshore on ships during the initial buildup for the invasion - meaning that 4ID and 4-42 would have to reroute operations through Kuwait instead of Turkey. The battalion deployed to Iraq through Kuwait in late April 2003. Combat operations were conducted initially in the area of Taji Airfield, just outside Baghdad. The battalion moved north to the Tikrit area, leaving Battery B at Taji in support of Task Force Gunner until approximately October 2003. The battalion (less B Btry until fall) was stationed at FOB Arrow near the village of Ad-Dawr, slightly to the southeast of Tikrit along the Tigris River, with various fire support elements attached to 1-22 Infantry, 1-10 Cavalry, 1-66 and 3-66 Armor, as far south as Samarra and north past Tikrit. During their time at FOB Arrow the battalion conducted infantry operations in their sector. These operations included dismounted OP/LP operations around their area (specifically Ad-Dawr), mounted and dismounted combat patrols, raids against high-value targets or suspected insurgents, and general patrolling and stability operations in and around Ad-Dawr. In addition to these non-traditional roles, the battalion still provided fire support to the 1st Brigade and other units in the area. 4–42 continued to conduct combat operations until their redeployment in March 2004. During this first deployment to Iraq, the battalion was responsible for capturing several former regime members that were wanted by the coalition, captured scores of weapons and explosives, and engaged in direct combat with insurgents and terrorists in their area.

Red Dawn
The battalion also participated in Operation Red Dawn in December 2003, and had unit members on the objective during the capture of former Iraqi President Saddam Hussein.

Stability operations
The battalion helped to rebuild schools and adopted the Nasiba Primary School for Girls, completing its refurbishment in November 2003. Much focus was given to providing security to the local population, insuring safe and secure access to public services such as power and water, food distribution and fuel/petroleum sales.

Iraq, 2005–2006
The battalion was deployed again in December 2005 to Camp Taji, 14 kilometers north of Baghdad. The Straight Arrow battalion was given the task of providing security for Camp Taji and maintaining a presence on Highway 1. They returned to Fort Hood in December 2006.

Iraq, 2007–2009
The 4th Battalion, 42nd Field Artillery, Straight Arrows, deployed to Iraq for its third tour in March 2008 as part of Operation Iraqi Freedom 07-09. This tour saw the battalion separated from its parent brigade and attached to 2nd Brigade, 101st Airborne Division. Headquartered inside the International Zone of Baghdad, the Straight Arrows were charged with the task of supporting the Iraqi Army and monitoring the Karkh and Mansour districts of Baghdad. During this deployment the battalion supported two joint-security stations and conducted more than 3,500 total patrols in the district. The Straight Arrows then redeployed in March 2009 to Fort Hood, Texas for the last time.

Return and restationing at Fort Carson
Once they redeployed and uncased their colors, they changed battalion commanders in June 2009 and immediately moved to Fort Carson, Colo. July and August 2009 were spent standing up the battalion at Fort Carson, establishing systems, conducting reset operations and building combat power.

The fall of 2009 gave the battalion opportunities to conduct multiple squad and platoon-level training events. The Straight Arrows finalized the fielding of their howitzers from PMHBCT during the week of Thanksgiving and then immediately conducted Table VIII certification. The training provided soldiers an excellent environment with temperatures as low as minus 30 degrees and several inches of snow. In January 2010, 4–42 FA deployed in similar weather conditions to provide indirect fires in support of Alpha Company, 3rd Battalion, 75th Ranger training on Fort Carson ranges. The battalion's deployment mission was finalized and the Straight Arrows transitioned the entire formation to a motorized infantry battalion.

The battalion participated in Raider Blitz, a brigade field training exercise, as a motorized infantry battalion. Then the Straight Arrow battalion, as a member of the 1st (Raider) Brigade Combat Team, 4th Infantry Division, deployed to the Joint Readiness Training Center for counterinsurgency training, in April 2010, with the battalion conducting maneuver operations as a battlespace operator. The battalion also completed deployment preparations, conducted final training for theater requirements and executed torch and advance party operations to Afghanistan.

Operation Enduring Freedom
The battalion completed its rotation to Afghanistan as part of the 1st Brigade Combat Team, 4th Infantry Division's deployment in support of Operation Enduring Freedom. The battalion initiated relief in place/transfer of authority with 4th Squadron, 73rd Cavalry Regiment, part of 4th Brigade, 82nd Airborne in late July 2010. The unit conducted security force assistance operations with the Afghanistan National Army (ANA), the Afghanistan Provincial Police Forces and by supporting the national defense security. The battalion remained focused on security operations in support of Afghanistan as well as increasing the Afghan National Security Forces capabilities. 4-42 Field Artillery was able to make great progress in the Farah Province through constantly engaging the Taliban, by taking the Dukin/Charpoc Charmas area along with improving the security and quality of life for the Masaw District. 4-42 FA was relieved in place in July 2011 by the 2d Brigade Combat Team Special Troops Battalion, 2d Brigade, 4th Infantry Division, and redeployed to Fort Carson.

Inactivation
The battalion was de-activated by the Army along with the 1st Battalion, 22nd Infantry regiment on 17 March 2014 at Fort Carson, Colorado. The colors of the unit were cased and sent to the Army Center of Military History.

OIF I operations
 Operation Planet X (15 May 2003)
 Operation Peninsula Strike (9 June 2003 – 12 June 2003)
 Operation Desert Scorpion (15 June 2003 – 29 June 2003)
 Operation Sidewinder (29 June 2003 – 7 July 2003)
 Operation Soda Mountain (12 July 2003 – 17 July 2003)
 Operation Ivy Serpent (12 July 2003 – 21 July 2003)
 Operation Ivy Lightning (12 August 2003)
 Operation Ivy Needle (26 August 2003 – ?)
 Operation Industrial Sweep (October 2003)
 Operation Ivy Cyclone (7 November 2003 – ?)
 Operation Ivy Cyclone II (17 November 2003 – ?)
 Operation Red Dawn (13 December 2003)
 Operation Ivy Blizzard (17 December 2003 – ?)
 Operation Arrowhead Blizzard (17 December 2003 – ?)

Lineage
 Constituted 5 July 1918 in the National Army as Battery D, 42nd Field Artillery, an element of the 14th Division
 Organized 10 August 1918 at Camp Custer, Michigan
 Demobilized 7 February 1919 at Camp Custer, Michigan
 Reconstituted 1 October 1933 in the Regular Army as Battery D, 42nd Field Artillery.
 Absorbed 1 October 1940 by Battery A, 42nd Field Artillery Battalion. (Battery A, 42nd Field Artillery, redesignated 1 October 1940 as Battery A, 42nd Field Artillery Battalion, and activated at Fort Benning, Georgia, as an element of the 4th Division – later redesignated as the 4th Infantry Division
 Inactivated 16 February 1946 at Fort Ord, California
 Consolidated 28 June 1950 with Battery A, 42nd Coast Artillery [organized in 1907], and consolidated unit designated as Battery A, 42nd Field Artillery Battalion
 Former Battery D, 42nd Field Artillery, reconstituted 1 April 1957 in the Regular Army and redesignated as Headquarters and Headquarters Battery, 4th Howitzer Battalion, 42nd Artillery, activated 6 May 1959 at Fort Lewis, Washington
 Redesignated 1 October 1963 as the 4th Battalion, 42nd Artillery
 Inactivated 15 December 1970 at Fort Carson, Colorado
 Redesignated 1 September 1971 as the 4th Battalion, 42nd Field Artillery
 Redesignated at Fort Hood, TX with the 4th Infantry Division 16 January 1996.
 Redesignated at Fort Carson, CO with the 4th Infantry Division June 2009
 Inactivated 17 March 2014 at Fort Carson, CO

Campaign participation credit

World War I: Alsace 1918
World War II: Normandy (with arrowhead); Northern France; Rhineland; Ardennes-Alsace; Central Europe
Vietnam: Counteroffensive, Phase II; Counteroffensive, Phase III; Tet Counteroffensive; Counteroffensive, Phase IV; Counteroffensive, Phase V; Counteroffensive, Phase VI; Tet 69/Counteroffensive; Summer-Fall 1969; Winter-Spring 1970; Sanctuary Counteroffensive; Counteroffensive, Phase VII; Consolidation I; Consolidation II; Cease-Fire
 Operation Iraqi Freedom: Liberation of Iraq, 2003; Transition of Iraq, 2003-2004; Iraqi Governance, 2005-2005; National Resolution, 2005-2006; Iraqi Surge, 2007-2008; Iraqi Sovereignty, 2009-2010
 Operation Enduring Freedom (Afghanistan): Consolidation III, 2010-2011; Transition I, 2011-2011

Decorations

 Presidential Unit Citation (Army), Streamer embroidered LUXEMBOURG (42nd Field Artillery Battalion cited; WD GO 30, 1946)
 Valorous Unit Award for service in Iraq during Operation Red Dawn (Capture of Saddam Hussein) (DA GO 2009–11 16 December 2009)
 Valorous Unit Award for service in Iraq (OIF 07-09) (DA GO 2010–16–3 September 2010)
 Meritorious Unit Commendation for service in Iraq (PO 208-26, 27 July 2009)
 Meritorious Unit Commendation for service in Afghanistan (OEF 10-11) (PO 202-15, 21 July 2011)
 Army Superior Unit Award for successful participation in the Army's Advanced Warfighting Experiment; March 1997 (DA GO 0125 June 2001)
 Belgian Fourragère 1940 (42nd Field Artillery Battalion cited; DA GO 43, 1950)
 Cited in the Order of the Day of the Belgian Army for action in BELGIUM (42nd Field Artillery Battalion cited; DA GO 43, 1950)

Killed In Action

World War II

 5 March 1944 - Thomas Evison (Britain)
 6 June 1944 - William M. Eason (France)
 6 June 1944 - Charles A. Frawley (France)
 6 June 1944 - Harry P. Singley (France)
 7 June 1944 - John E. Thomas (France)
 8 June 1944 - Thomas J. Roland (France)
 8 June 1944 - James W. Wesley (France)
 12 June 1944 - Charles G. Langley (France)
 26 June 1944 - William R. Buchanan (France)
 6 July 1944 - Harvey Wolpin (France)
 12 August 1944 - John R. Dresback (France)
 12 August 1944 - James D. Holcomb (France)
 15 September 1944 - Albert G. Crosby (Belgium)
 5 November 1944 - Charles Kinsman Jr. (Belgium)
 10 November 1944 - Lester R. Young Jr. (Belgium)
 13 November 1944 - William H. Purdy (Belgium)
 16 December 1944 - Mark M. Miller (Belgium)
 22 January 1945 - Orlando F. Gabriele (Luxembourg)
 16 March 1945 - Lyman Miller (France)
 24 April 1945 - Wilson E. Dudley (France)
 24 April 1945 - Kenneth W. Briscoe (France)

Vietnam War
 11 November 1966 – Charles Edward Brown Jr. (Battery C)
 11 December 1966 – Dennis William Anderson (Battery B)
 14 December 1966 – Kim Sovereign Bird (Battery C)
 29 May 1967 – George Joseph Carr (Battery B)
 12 July 1967 – Fred Garland Bragg Jr. (Battery B)
 12 July 1967 – Le Roy Harland Charboneau (Battery B)
 12 July 1967 – James Michael Haider (Battery B)
 9 November 1967 – Robert E Scharon III (Battery B)
 20 November 1967 – Thelbert G Page (HHB)
 26 November 1967 – Jonathan Blue Jr. (HHB)
 30 November 1967 – Jack Rogers (Battery A)
 2 February 1968 – John Paul Culp (Battery B)
 27 May 1968 – Larry Anthony Carvetta (Battery B)
 27 May 1968 – Tom Galvez (Battery B)
 27 May 1968 – Frank William Garapolo (Battery B)
 27 May 1968 – John Richard Lindel (Battery B)
 27 May 1968 – James Daniel McKelvey (Battery B)
 1 June 1968 – Gary Koyle Darrah (Battery B)
 1 June 1968 – Robert Lee Graham (Battery B)
 1 June 1968 – Joseph Cephus King Jr. (Battery B)
 28 August 1968 – Marcelino Nieves-Colon Jr. (Battery C)
 7 September 1968 – Michael John Abruzzesa (Battery A)
 7 September 1968 – John Wayne Johnson (Battery A)
 7 September 1968 – George Dennis Taylor (Battery A)
 11 November 1968 – John Daniel Shermos (HHB)
 3 March 1969 – Jerry Glenn Ervin (Battery B)
 21 February 1970 – Jeffrey Thomas Beardsley (Battery C)
 13 May 1970 – Richard Alan Patterson (Battery C)
 11 September 1970 – James Leonard Knobles (HHB)

Iraq War
1st Tour 2003 to 2004
 13 August 2003 – SSG Steven W. White (HHB) – Killed when his armored personnel carrier hit an anti-tank mine.
 18 September 2003 – SPC. Richard Arriaga (HHB) – Killed when ambushed by small arms fire and a rocket propelled grenade near Tikrit, Iraq.
 18 September 2003 – SGT. Anthony O. Thompson (HHB) – Killed when ambushed by small arms fire and a rocket propelled grenade near Tikrit, Iraq.
 18 September 2003 – SPC. James C. Wright (HHB) – Killed when ambushed by small arms fire and a rocket propelled grenade near Tikrit, Iraq.

Second tour 2005-06
 27 June 2006 – SFC Terry O.P. Wallace (HHB) – Killed when an IED hit his Humvee outside of Camp Taji
 14 September 2006 – CPL Russell M. Makowski (B) – Killed by an IED while on dismounted patrol outside the Taji Market.

Third Tour 2008-09
 27 August 2008 – SGT David K. Cooper (FSC) – Killed by sniper fire in MH606 market in Qadasiyah sector of Baghdad.

Afghanistan War
First Tour 2010 to 2011
 14 June 2011 – PFC Eric D. Soufrine (B) – Killed by improvised explosive device near Bala Baluk in the Farah Province.

War on Terror
2013 through 2014
 May 2013 – SPC Charles Mcclure (A) – Killed in rollover at Camp Buehring, Kuwait.
 May 2013 – SPC Trinidad Santiago (A) – Killed in rollover at Camp Buehring, Kuwait.

See also
 42nd Field Artillery Regiment

References

External links
 
 

042 4
Military units and formations established in 1918
Military units and formations disestablished in 2014